Westland Studios was a recording studio located in Dublin, Ireland. It was located on Lombard Street, less than a minute's walk from Pearse Station. It was opened in 1985 and closed in August 2018. Between 1985 and 2010 it was under the management of Tom Costello and his daughter Deirdre Costello and was leased out to producer and engineer Alwyn Walker from 2010 until its closure in 2018.

Early history
The studio opened in 1976 under the name Lombard Sound and was the first 2-inch 24-track studio in Ireland. Briefly it was named Miracle Studios (as seen on the credits of the album "Aliens" by Horslips). It had a very large board of directors composed of recording artists, record label owner and artist managers. The studio ran under this format until 1984 when they sold all of the equipment and disbanded the company. Two of the directors (Tom Costello and Brian Molloy) of Lombard Sound took over the lease of the studio area and rebuilt the studio to a higher standard and extended the overall area of the studio facility. It re-opened quietly in October 1985 with its first session with Bill Whelan. Daire Winston was the house engineer at the time.

Past Clients
U2, Bob Dylan, Bryan Adams, The Corrs, Van Morrison, The Dubliners, Placebo, The Mighty Stef, Cathy Davey, Hozier, Miley Cyrus, Phil Coulter, Aslan, Ryan Sheridan, Migos, J. Cole, Toucan, Elevation Falls and Tyler The Creator.

Fate
Despite the studio's popularity in 2018 due to rising rental costs in Dublin City the studio closed its doors marking the end of 42 years of music recording history. The rooms are currently used for podcast recordings by headstuff under the name "The Podcast Studios". Westland's former manager Alwyn Walker currently works as an online mix engineer.

References

External links

Official Westland Studios website
The Podcast Studios
Alwyn The Mix Engineer

Recording studios in Ireland
Companies based in Dublin (city)